= Marianna Böhmová =

Czech opera singer

Marianna Böhmová (1750–after 1806) was an opera singer. She was engaged in Prague (1768–1770), Brno (1770–76) and then touring Austria and Southern Germany, all then areas of the Holy Roman Empire, where she was regarded as a singer of note in 1776–1792, before becoming the leader of her own operatic company. She was one of the first Czech opera singers.
